Jingu may refer to:

People
Empress Jingū (c. AD 169–269)
Toshio Jingu (born 1948), a Japanese fencer

Other uses
Jingu Stadium, Tokyo, Japan
Jingū, a name for Shinto shrines connected to the Imperial House of Japan
Busanjin District, South Korea, abbreviated locally as "Jin-gu"
Ise Grand Shrine, known simply as Jingū (The Shrine)
Jingū taima, an ofuda issued by the Ise Grand Shrine

Japanese-language surnames